The Nawaz Sharif Medical College (NSMC) (Urdu:) is a medical school located in Gujrat, Punjab, Pakistan. It is a constituent college of the University of Gujrat. It offers MBBS degree in affiliation with University of Health Sciences, Lahore. NSMC is accredited by the Pakistan Medical Commission (PMC). It is also recognized by the College of Physicians and Surgeons Pakistan (CPSP) for postgraduate training programs. The college is listed in International Medical Education Directory (IMED).

History
Chief Minister of the Punjab Shahbaz Sharif inaugurated the college in September 2008. It was established to provide medical education and healthcare facilities for industrial regions of Jhelum, Gujranwala, Sialkot and Gujrat. The first principal of the college was Dr Nasir Aziz Kamboh.

Campus
The college is housed in one of the blocks of the University of Gujrat. On 15 March 2012, Chief Minister Shahbaz Sharif visited the college and approved the construction of a new building for the college adjacent to the university. The new campus spans 62 acres.

Departments

Basic science departments
Anatomy
Biochemistry
Community medicine
Forensic medicine
Pathology
Pharmacology
Physiology

Medicine and allied departments
Cardiology
Dermatology
Endocrinology & Metabolism
General medicine
Neurology
Pediatrics
Preventive medicine
Psychiatry
Pulmonology (Chest medicine)
Radiotherapy
Urology

Surgery and allied departments
Anesthesiology
Cardiac surgery
Cosmetic surgery
General surgery
Neurosurgery
Obstetrics and gynaecology
Ophthalmology
Oral and maxillofacial surgery
Orthopedics
Otorhinolaryngology
Pediatric surgery
Radiology

Administrative departments
IT Department

Admission policy
The College admits 90 students on open merit. Admission is granted through an annual admission test MDCAT conducted by the University of Health Sciences, Lahore. 10 seats are reserved for foreign students, specifically children of overseas Pakistanis and dual nationality holders of Pakistani origin, which students can apply for through the HEC.

Teaching hospital
Aziz Bhatti Shaheed Hospital has been attached with Nawaz Sharif Medical College as teaching hospital. It has almost 700 beds capacity at present. A new building is added to the hospital recently.

Library
Besides the main library, there are four constituent college's libraries. There are about 90,000 books available in all five libraries. A wide variety of online full-text journals' databases are available including Higher Education Commission (Pakistan) (HEC) and Pakistan Education and Research Network (PERN) project. Thousands of digital books can be accessed through the library website on a variety of subjects.

See also
 Hashmat Medical and Dental College
 List of medical schools in Pakistan
 College of Physicians and Surgeons Pakistan
 Pakistan Medical and Dental Council
 University of Gujrat
 University of Health Sciences, Lahore

References

External links
NSMC official website

Medical colleges in Punjab, Pakistan
Academic institutions in Pakistan
Educational institutions established in 2008
Universities and colleges in Gujrat, Pakistan
2008 establishments in Pakistan